Thore Sixten Enochsson (later Thorhammer, 17 November 1908 – 14 March 1993) was a Swedish long-distance runner. He won a silver medal in the marathon at the 1934 European Championships and finished tenth at the 1936 Summer Olympics. Enochsson won the Stockholm half-marathon (25 km) in 1933–36.

References

Athletes (track and field) at the 1936 Summer Olympics
Olympic athletes of Sweden
Swedish male long-distance runners
1908 births
1993 deaths
European Athletics Championships medalists
People from Östersund
Sportspeople from Jämtland County